Map of places in Ceredigion compiled from this list
 See the list of places in Wales for places in other principal areas.

This is a list of towns and villages in the county of Ceredigion, Wales.

 

A
Aber
Aberaeron
Aberarth
Aberffrwd
Aber-meurig
Abermagwr
Aberporth
Aberystwyth
Alltyblacca

B
Banc-y-môr
Bethania
Betws Bledrws
Betws Ifan
Beulah
Blaenplwyf
Blaenporth
Borth
Bow Street
Bronant
Brongest
Brynhoffnant
Bwlchllan

C
Caerwedros
Cei Bach
Capel Bangor
Capel Betws Leuci
Capel Dewi, Aberystwyth
Capel Dewi, Llandysul
Capel Seion
Cardigan
Cellan
Cenarth
Ciliau Aeron
Chancery
Commin Capel Betws
Comins Coch
Cribyn
Cross Inn, Llan-non
Cross Inn, Cei Newydd/New Quay
Cwmbrwyno
Cwmerfyn
Cwm Rheidol
Cwmsychbant
Cwmsymlog
Cwmtudu
Cwm Ystwyth
Cwrtnewydd

D
Devil's Bridge
Dihewyd
Dole
Drefach

E
Elerech

F
Felin Fach
Y Ferwig
Ffaldybrenin
Ffair Rhos
Ffoshelyg
Ffostrasol
Ffosyffin
Furnace

G
Gilfachreda
Glan-y-môr
Glynarthen
Goginan
Gors Goch
Gwbert

H
Henllan
Horeb

L
Lampeter
Llanarth
Llanbadarn Fawr
Llanddeiniol
Llandysul
Llanfair Clydogau
Llanfihangel y Creuddyn
Llangorwen
Llangranog
Llangwyryfon
Llangubi
Llanilar
Llanon
Llanrhystud
Llansantffraid
Llanddewi Brefi
Llanwenog
Llanwnnen
Llanybydder
Llechryd
Llwyncelyn

M
Monachty
Moriah
Mwnt
Mydroilyn

N
Nanternis
Newcastle Emlyn
New Quay

O
Oakford

P
Penbryn
Pen-y-wenallt
Penrhyn-coch
Pentregat
Penparc
Penparcau
Penuwch
Pen-y-garn
Pisgah
Plwmp
Pont rhyd y groes
Pontrhydfendigaid
Pontsian
Post-bach
Post-mawr

R
Rhydfelin
Rhydlewis
Rhydowen
Rhyd Rosser
Rhydypennau

S
Sarnau
Silian
Strata Florida
Synod Inn

T
Talgarreg
Tal-y-bont
Tan-y-groes
Temple Bar
Trawsgoed
Trefenter
Tregaron
Tremain
Tresaith
Troed y Rhiw

V
Velindre

W
Wallog

Y
Ysbyty Ystwyth
Ystrad Aeron
Ystrad Ffin
Ystrad Meurig
Ystumtuen

Categorised by Administrative Divisions

Electoral wards
This is a list of electoral wards:

Communities
This is a list of communities:

See also
List of places in Wales

References

Geography of Ceredigion
Ceredigion